The Tagliamento is a braided river in north-east Italy, flowing from the Alps to the Adriatic Sea at a point between Trieste and Venice.

The Tagliamento river is  considered  as  the  last  morphologically  intact  river  in the Alps.  (Its course has not been altered by human intervention). 
For this reason, it has been the subject of many scientific investigations into its peculiar characteristics:  these include its 150 km long corridor which connects the Alps and the Adriatic Sea, its unconstrained floodplain, which hosts several aquatic and terrestrial habitats, and its over 600 islands.

The source is in the Mauria Pass, on the border between the regions of Veneto and Friuli-Venezia Giulia.  In the upper section, it flows through the historic Carnia region, in the northern part of the province of Udine.    In the middle and lower sections, it first sets the boundary between the provinces of Udine and Pordenone and later between the former and the Province of Venice.  Finally, it flows into the Gulf of Venice between Lignano Sabbiadoro and Bibione.

The watershed lies almost entirely in Carnia and the other mountain valleys of Friuli.   86.5% of the watershed is in the Province of Udine.

The main towns along its banks are Latisana and San Michele al Tagliamento.  In the vicinity of the river are the following towns: Tolmezzo, Gemona del Friuli, San Daniele del Friuli, Spilimbergo, Casarsa della Delizia, Codroipo, San Vito al Tagliamento, Pinzano al Tagliamento.

Course
Initially, the river's course is in a west to east direction, parallel to the Carnic Alps range. 

The river passes through Pinzano and courses in a southward direction, while spreading across the plain reaching a width of  near Spilimbergo and splitting into a number of branches. Its gravelly bed is very permeable, and it absorbs almost all its waters, but the river recovers most of the flow downstream of Codroipo and Casarsa, thanks to abundant flows from underground rivers. 
Before ending its course, the river receives the waters of a small underground river, the Varmo. Finally, the river flows into the Adriatic Sea between Lignano and Bibione.

Names
In addition to the Italian name Tagliamento, the river is known by different names in other languages of the region.  The Friulan official name for the river is Tiliment; other local variants include Taiament, Tilimint, Tiument, Timent, and Tuement.  In Venetian, the river is known as Tajamento, in Slovene, Tilment, and in Latin, Tiliaventum or Taliamentum.  It was known as Dülmende in German during the Middle Ages.

References

Rivers of the Province of Udine
Rivers of the Province of Belluno
Rivers of the Province of Pordenone
Rivers of the Metropolitan City of Venice
Rivers of Italy
Braided rivers in Italy
Adriatic Italian coast basins